Gantumoote is a 2019 Indian Kannada language coming of age drama film written and directed by Roopa Rao and produced by Rao and Sahadev Kelvadi. Having previously directed short films and web series', this is Rao's debut feature film. Set in the 90s in Bangalore, this film follows the life of Meera, a high school teenager and her first tryst with love and the story that ensues. It had its world premiere in New York Indian Film Festival on May 11, 2019, and later released in India on October 18, 2019 and in USA on November 8, 2019.

Gantumoote won the Best Screenplay Award at the New York Indian Film Festival, being the first Kannada film to do so. It received critical acclaim upon release.

Plot 

An intense coming off age, high school drama set in Bangalore in the 1990s (Pre-Internet Era). 
A relatable story of a sixteen-year-old girl and her subtle journey from the life that she thinks exists just like in the movies to the actual life that unravels to her. A tale of struggles with understanding herself, the changing world, educational pressures, bullying, competition over marks  – all of it wrapped up in transcending journey of first love.

Cast 
 Teju Belawadi as Meera Deshpande
 Yukti as young Meera
 Nischith Korodi as Madhu 
 Bhargav Raju as Dheeraj
 Sharath Gowda as Raju 
 Spoorthi Gumaste as Rashmi
 Anushree Kashyap as Sajida
 Sri Ranga Kothur as Babu 
 Chandana. M. Rao as Jyothi
 Varsha as Sowmya
 Shreya Hiremath as Madhu's sister
 Kashyap as Abdul
 Akshay Prasad as Mohan
 Surya Vasishta as the Math teacher
 Prathima Vajra as the English teacher
 Pruthwi Banawasi as the principal 
 Chandrashekar as Madhu's father
 Satish Kumar as the auto driver
 Namith Gowda as Prajwal
 Roopa Rao in a cameo appearance

Soundtrack 
The soundtrack and background score was scored by Aparajith Sris, and the audio was released on 23 September 2019. The music was recorded and produced at KrishT Inn Tunes in Bangalore, and mixed and mastered at Tarang Studio. The backing vocals were given by Sri's, Deepak Seth, Eesha Suchi and Surabhi Soman.

Reception 
Gantumoote received positive reviews from critics.

Karthik Hebbar of The Hindu called it "a precious gem", further appreciating it by remarking "the real beauty of the film though is in the narrative. The unabashed, unapologetic journey of a girl finding passion and exploring it without inhibition. The camera here gazes at the male body through the female gaze. It is her stare, her pursuit and her passion in play here. The cinema understands and disrobes the real world through this very unique feminine gaze..."

Baradwaj Rangan of Film Companion called it "exquisitely directed and enacted" and praised the director, saying that "Rao manages something very difficult. She holds a series of moods throughout, and the places she chooses to linger on are unusual. She is more interested in character than event, and she practically holds up an X-ray of Meera’s soul. Her framing is unfussy, and yet, there’s quiet beauty in the images of, say, Meera and Madhu against the backdrop of a stone wall. These are little snatches of visual poetry, as is Teju Belawadi’s face."

Theres Sudeep of Deccan Herald said, Gantumoote is a must-watch. It is not every day that you see a film getting a standing ovation as the end credits roll. Gantumoote is such a film."

A Shraddhaa of New Indian Express said the film "does justice to the film’s tag line —baggage — and comes with its own sets of emotions and nostalgia, which take the audience to the good old days." and reviewed, "The subject of innocence and romance requires a certain dose of boldness to be portrayed on screen, especially in Sandalwood, since there are only a few movies that have crossed the limit to project the feelings in a natural manner. Given an A certificate by the censor board, Roopa Rao’s romantic tale, Gantumoote, does cross the conventional barriers, and kisses and cuddles become an innocent part of the story, never becoming vulgar."

Harish Mallya of The News Minute called it, "a rare gem in Kannada cinema [...] Though it looks like a school romance story at the onset, the treatment is very fresh and unique for Kannada cinema." He further noted, "The challenge in making a film like this is that you do not have anything new that can be told. It should turn out to be a collection of experiences. Watching the film, it clearly shows how carefully the team has chosen the moments and has captured those in the most realistic manner, devoid of any glorification and glamour. The charm lies in the simplicity which is apparent all over the film."

Festival Selections 
Young Film Market – Mercato Europeo Del Cinema Giovane E Indipendente
Nitte International Film Festival 2020
New York Indian Film Festival 2019
Ottawa Indian Film Festival and Awards 2019
Indian Film Festival of Melbourne 2019
Tasveer South Asian Film Festival 2019
International Women’s Film Festival 2019

Nominations and Awards 
Nomination: Best Film in Critics Choice awards 2020 (Mumbai)
Nomination: Best Film Critics awards 2020 (Karnataka)
Best Screenplay: NYIFF 2019
Nomination: Best Film in OIIFA 2019
Finalist: International Women Film Festival 2019
Nomination: Best Debut Director- Telugu (South Indian International Movie Awards)

Accolades 
Gantumoote created history by becoming the first ever Kannada film to win the Best Screenplay Award at the New York Indian Film Festival.

References

External links 
 

2019 films
2010s Kannada-language films